Chandanaish is an upazila of Chattogram District in Chattogram Division, Bangladesh.

History 
Chandanaish is one of the first inhabitant of the early settlers of Chittagong. Muslim traders and preachers from the then Islamic worlds had been settling in Chittagong due to the close proximity of Chandanaish from the river Karnaphuly. However, the Muslim settlement was permanently established when the medieval Islamic invasion occurred in Chittagong.

Chandanaish was previously part of Patiya upazila. In 1976, Chandanaish was separated from Patiya and established as Chandanaish thana and in 1983 it became an upazila.

Geography
It has 30,189 households and a total area of 201.99 km2. Its west side is plainland and its east side is surrounded with the tertiary hill tracts. Here cultivable land is very fertile. Sangu is the main river but there are also small rivers and canals like Borumoti (Borguni Khal locally called), Chandkhali river etc. There are a lot of Beels such as Moga Beel, Arah Beel, Ronger Beel.

Demographics
According to the 1991 Bangladesh census, Chandanaish had a population of 172,843. Males constituted 51.27% of the population, and females 48.73%. The population aged 18 or over was 81,653. Chandanaish had an average literacy rate of 33.9% (7+ years), compared to the national average of 32.4%.

Administration
Chandanaish Upazila is divided into Chandanaish Municipality, Dohazari Municipality, and nine union parishads: Bailtali, Barama, Barkal, Dhopachhari, Dohazari, Hashimpur, Joara, Kanchanabad, and Satbaria. The union parishads are subdivided into 44 mauzas and 46 villages.

Chandanaish Municipality is subdivided into 9 wards and 12 mahallas.

MP: Nazrul Islam Chowdhury
Upazila Chairman:Alhaz Abdul Jabbar Chowdhur.   
Vice Chairman: M Solaiman Faruque
Female V. Chairman: Kamela Rupa

Education
Universities
 BGC Trust University Bangladesh (BGCTUB)

Medical colleges
 BGC Trust Medical College

Colleges
 BGC Trust Academy (School & College)
 Gachhbaria Govt. College
 Barama Degree College
 Amanatsafa Badrunnesa Mohila College
 Satbaria Oli Ahmad Bir Bikram College
 Begum Gul Chemanara Academy

High schools
 Gachhbaria Nityananda Gaurochandra Govt. Model High School(1918)
 Gachhbaria Mamtaz Begum High School
 Fatema Jinnah Girls' High School
 Satbaria High School
 East Satbaria High School
 Bailtali High School
 Jafarabad High School
 Barama Trahi Menaka High School (1925)
 Joara B. Chowdhury High School
 Barkal SZ High School
 Shuchia High School
 Kanchanabad High School
 Kashem Mahbub High School 
 Jamijuri Boys' School
 (Hashimpur M.A.K.U High School)
 Khandighi M.L. High School
 Patandondy High School
 Keshua High School

Madrasahs
 Hashimpur Mokbuliya Fazil Madrasah
 Jafarabad Fazil Madrasah
 Joara Islamia Fazil Madrasah
 Elahabad Ahmadiyya Sunniyya Fazil Madrasah
 Jamijuri Sunniyya Madrasah
 Abu Mariam Mahila Madrasah
 Late Sona Meah Choudory Senior Madrasah
 Hashimpur Bhandari Para Dakhil Madrasah
 Satbaria Baro Awlia Alim Madrasah
 Rahmania Ahmadia A.S. Sunnia Dakhil Madrasah (South Gachbari Dakhil Madrasah)

Others
 Jamalur Rahman Khan Science-Technology School & College (Jamijuri Technical School and College)
 Alhaz Nurul Islam Pre-cadet School
 Mozaher Para BRAC School, Hashimpur
 Kanaimadary Junior high school

Health 
Chandnaish upazila has 2 hospitals, 2 upazila health complexes, 5 union health centers, 10 family planning centers and 10 community clinics.

Communication System 
The main communication road in Chandanish Upazila is Chittagong-Cox's Bazar highway. This upazila can be contacted over Barkal Bridge of Chittagong-Anwara District. Can be contacted by various types of vehicles. In addition, this upazila has 91 km of paved roads, 450 km of semi-pacara roads, 700 km of unpaved roads. This upazila also has rail communication system. There is also a communication system with other upazilas through Sangu river.

Notable persons 
 Maniruzzaman Islamabadi – a notable politician, and religious reformer in British India 
 Hossain Zillur Rahman – economist, advisor to caretaker government of Bangladesh 
 Colonel (Rtd) Oli Ahmad Bir Bikram – Member of Parliament, president of Liberal Democratic Party (Bangladesh)
 Md. Nazrul Islam Chowdhury – Member of Parliament
 Nurul Islam – physician, National Professor of Bangladesh

See also
 Upazilas of Bangladesh
 Districts of Bangladesh
 Divisions of Bangladesh

References

Upazilas of Chittagong District